Vi som går kjøkkenveien (We Who Enter Through the Kitchen) is a Norwegian comedy film from 1933. The film was a joint production between the Norwegian and Swedish film industries, and it was shot in parallel with a Swedish version titled Vi som går köksvägen. Both versions of the film were directed by Tancred Ibsen and Gustaf Molander. The lead roles in the Norwegian version were played by Theodor Berge and Randi Brænne, whereas the Swedish version starred Carl Barcklind, Tutta Berntzen, and Bengt Djurberg.

The indoor scenes in the film were shot at Filmstaden in Råsunda. The outdoor scenes were shot in Tollare and Saxtorp, southeast of Landskrona.

The Swedish version of the film was released in 1932. The Norwegian version had its premiere at Konsertpalæet in Bergen on February 3, 1933. The film's Oslo premiere took place on February 20, 1933.

Cast (Norwegian version) 
 Ulf Selmer as Adolf Beck, a landowner
 Theodor Berge as Breder, Helga's father, a motorcycle manufacturer
 Randi Brænne as Helga Breder / Helga Haraldson, Breder's daughter
 Steinar Jøraandstad as Frigaard, Beck's chauffeur
 Gunhild Schytte-Jacobsen as Mrs. Beck
 Hilda Fredriksen as Laura, Beck's cook
 Joachim Holst-Jensen as Pontus the editor
 Aagot Didriksen as Laura Pontus
 Renée Björling as Astrid, Beck's daughter
 Tove Tellback as Ellen, Beck's daughter
 Einar Fagstad as Opstan, a sexton and schoolteacher
 Egil Hjorth-Jenssen as Anders, Beck's servant boy
 Ragna Breda as Olga, Beck's servant girl
 Harald Heide Steen as Jørgen Krogh
 Eva Steen as Aunt Alexandra

References

External links 
 
 Vi som går kjøkkenveien at the National Library of Norway
 Vi som går kjøkkenveien at the Swedish Film Database

1933 films
Norwegian black-and-white films
Norwegian comedy films
Films directed by Tancred Ibsen
Films directed by Gustaf Molander
Films based on Norwegian novels
1930s Norwegian-language films
1933 comedy films